Associação - Desportivo Jorge Antunes is a sports club based in Vizela, Portugal. The club was originally founded as Grupo Desportivo da Lasa but in 1989 it became involved with the Fundação Jorge Antunes (Jorge Antunes Foundation) and changed its name to Grupo Desportivo Fundação Jorge Antunes, before again changing it to its current name in 2011. The club is best known for its futsal team which has previously played in the Portuguese Futsal First Division.

Honours
National
Portugal Cup:
Winner (2): 2000–01, 2001–02
Runner-up (1): 2007–08
Supercup:
Runner-up (2): 2001, 2002

Former players

External links
 Official website
 Playmakerstats.com

Futsal clubs in Portugal
Association football clubs established in 1979
1979 establishments in Portugal